Hîrtop (Hyrtop, Gyrtop) is a commune in the Grigoriopol sub-district of Transnistria, Moldova. It is composed of four villages: Bruslachi (Бруслаки), Hîrtop, Marian (Маріян, Мариян) and Mocreachi (Мокряки). It is currently under the administration of the breakaway government of the Transnistrian Moldovan Republic.

References

Communes of Transnistria